Delahanty is a family name. It may refer to the following people:

Dolores Delahanty, a civil rights activist
Ed Delahanty, a Major League Baseball left fielder
Frank Delahanty, a Major League Baseball left fielder
Jim Delahanty, a Major League Baseball second baseman
Joe Delahanty, a Major League Baseball left fielder
Thomas Delahanty, a police officer
Thomas E. Delahanty, a justice of the Maine Supreme Judicial Court
Thomas E. Delahanty II, a United States Attorney for the District of Maine
Tom Delahanty, a Major League Baseball third baseman

de:Delahanty